The Shire of Broadford was a local government area about  north of Melbourne, the state capital of Victoria, Australia.

History

Broadford was first incorporated as a road district on 29 January 1869, and became a shire on 24 December 1874.

On 18 November 1994, the Shire of Broadford was abolished, and along with the Rural City of Seymour, the Shire of Pyalong, and parts of the Shire of McIvor, was merged into the newly created Shire of Mitchell. The King Parrot and Strath Creek districts were transferred to the newly created Shire of Murrindindi.

Wards

The Shire of Broadford was divided into three ridings, each of which elected three councillors:
 East Riding
 North Riding
 South Riding

Towns and localities
 Broadford*
 Clonbinane
 Petersons
 Reedy Creek
 Strath Creek
 Tyaak
 Waterford Park

* Council seat.

Population

* Estimate in the 1958 Victorian Year Book.

References

External links
 Victorian Places - Broadford and Broadford Shire

Broadford